Richard S. Hartunian (born January 13, 1961) is an American attorney who served as the United States Attorney for the Northern District of New York from 2010 to 2017.

Resignation
Hartunian submitted his resignation when it was requested on March 10, 2017, but the resignation was declined so that he could continue serving in office until June 2017 and thereby complete 20 years of service with the Justice Department. He was, along with Deirdre M. Daly one of two U.S. Attorneys granted this extension. He officially resigned on June 30, 2017.

See also
 2017 dismissal of U.S. attorneys

References

1961 births
Living people
United States Attorneys for the Northern District of New York
New York (state) Democrats
Georgetown University alumni
Albany Law School alumni